Goldstar Air was a planned Ghanaian airline to be based at Kotoka International Airport in Accra. It planned to launch flights to both regional and long-haul destinations, but never commenced operations. As of 2021, the airline is no longer listed as having a valid Air Carrier License by Ghana Civil Aviation Authority.

The company has repeatedly been recognized as among the most notorious "fake airlines" of the world as it failed to commence operations despite numerous public statements and advertisements. In 2017, Ghana Civil Aviation Authority released a statement advising the public not to do business with Goldstar Air since the company lacked any operating permit.

Goldstar Air claimed to be a strategic partner of the Government of Liberia to establish Lone Star Air in 2020 as the national airline of Liberia, but that carrier also failed to commence operations.

History 
Goldstar Air was founded in 2014 as Goldstar Airlines. It planned to begin operations on 13 June 2014 with twice-weekly flights to Baltimore in the United States and London–Gatwick, followed by Guangzhou, China and Natal in Brazil. The airline planned to use McDonnell Douglas MD-11 and Boeing 747 aircraft. However, the launch date was postponed to late July 2014 before being indefinitely postponed, as the airline was still awaiting certification from the GCAA.

Goldstar Air has experienced delays in receiving certification from the GCAA. In September 2014, it appealed to President John Dramani Mahama for help, as the GCAA had still not inspected the airline's aircraft and facilities in the United States. In July 2015, Goldstar Air threatened to stage a protest in Accra against the GCAA, after it allowed South African Airways to operate the same route Goldstar Air had applied for (Accra to Washington, D.C.). However, the protest was avoided when Minister for Transport Dzifa Ativor ordered the GCAA to inspect Goldstar Air's aircraft.

In January 2016, the airline announced it would begin a training programme for flight attendants. Goldstar Air will employ local Ghanaian flight attendants but will initially employ expatriates for the cockpit crew. In June 2016, Goldstar Air said it was working on obtaining its Air Carrier Licence, after which it would receive its air operator's certificate and commence operations by the third quarter of the year. The airline has secured incentives from Baltimore Airport authorities in preparation for Goldstar Air's planned flights to the airport. Goldstar Air later revealed that it would use the Diamond Hangar FBO at London Stansted Airport as a maintenance facility and employee training school.

In August 2016, Goldstar Air announced that it had purchased three aircraft, which needed to be inspected by the GCAA. The following September, the GCAA released a notice advising customers not to do business with the airline, stating that Goldstar had begun to advertise its services despite lacking an operating permit.

In October 2020, Goldstar Air signed a strategic partnership agreement with the Government of Liberia to revive the national carrier under the "Lone Star Air" brand.

As of 2021, the airline is no longer listed as having a valid Air Carrier License by Ghana Civil Aviation Authority.

Despite not actually existing, Goldstar Air continues to sponsor award ceremonies to confer awards upon themselves. In 2022, they sponsored the "Ghana Aviation News Awards" which in turn awarded them with the "Emerging Airline Company of the Year" award.

Destinations
The airline planned to launch flights between Accra and Baltimore. Other destinations under consideration included London and various West African cities.

Fleet 
Goldstar Air planned to operate two Boeing 737-300s and three Boeing 777-200s as well as up to forty Airbus A380.

It projected a fleet of more than 100 modern aircraft.

The aircraft were planned to be named after former Presidents of Ghana.

 9G-AKUFFOADDO
 9G-JOHNMAHAMA
 9G-ATTAMILLS
 9G-JOHNKUFFUOR
 9G-JERRYJOHNRAWLINGS

In October 2020, Goldstar Air announced that it would also name an aircraft as 9G-H.E.GEORGEOPPONGWEAH in honour of George Weah, the President of Liberia.

Maintenance 

Goldstar Air announced its intention to conduct maintenance on its fleet at Tamale Airport. It has named its planned maintenance hangar after the National Chief Imam, Sheikh Dr. Alhaji Nuhu Sharabatu.
</ref>

See also
 List of defunct airlines of Ghana

References

External links 
 

Defunct airlines of Ghana
Airlines established in 2014
Ghanaian companies established in 2014